Waarish is a 2004 Bengali film directed by Kaushik Ganguly. It stars Debashree Roy, Mamata Shankar, Sabyasachi Chakraborty, Churni Ganguly and Aniket in the leading roles. The film marked Kaushik Ganguly's directorial debut and it was also Churni Ganguly first film on the big screen.

Plot
The film revolves around the characters Shubhankar (played by Sabyasachi Chakrabarty), Preeti (Debashree Roy) and Medha (Churni Ganguly). Medha is an ex-flame of Subhankar. Medha becomes pregnant after rendezvous with Subhankar. Though Medha was not married with Subhankar, she denies abortion and gives birth to a son, Megh.

Many years later, when Medha is suffering from cancer, comes to meet Shubhankar, discloses about her condition and requests him to take Megh into his care. At this time Subhankar is married to Preeti. So, he feels hesitant and shocked. Medha stays in Shubhankar's home and tells Preeti that she is Shubhankar's distant relative. Preeti starts caring for Medha like her own and makes her stay with them until the treatment is over. Medha's condition worsens and finally she dies.

Cast
Sabyasachi Chakrabarty as Subhankar
Debashree Roy as Preeti
Churni Ganguly as Medha
Aniket as Megh
Santu Mukhopadhyay

See also
 Shunyo E Buke
 Laptop

References

Notes

Citations 

Bengali-language Indian films
2004 films
Films directed by Kaushik Ganguly
2004 directorial debut films
2000s Bengali-language films